Mamadou Seck (born 23 August 1979) is a Senegalese former professional footballer who played as a defender.

Club career
Born in Rufisque, Seck started his career as a youth in August 1998 for Toulouse and was signed by Nîmes Olympique at the beginning of the 2000–01 season. He played 28 games in two seasons before signing for AC Ajaccio for whom he played 73 times, scoring four goals until signing for Kayseri Erciyesspor for the 2005–06 season. He played only eight times for the Turkish side, moving to Le Havre AC in January 2006, playing 11 times during his 12-month stay before being released on a free transfer to Sheffield United.

Seck signed a -year deal with Sheffield United on 16 January 2007 and made his Blades debut the same day, in a friendly at Bramall Lane against the Chengdu Blades. The game ended 1–1 with Seck playing 58 minutes. However, the Senegal international found first team opportunities limited in the Premier League season.

In January 2008 he was loaned out for a month to Championship side Scunthorpe United but made only one substitute appearance. Seck was released by Sheffield United at the end of the 2007–08 season.

International career
Seck played six times for Senegal national team.

References

External links
 Mamadou Seck profile at Sheffield United
 
 

1979 births
Living people
People from Rufisque
Senegalese footballers
Association football defenders
Senegal international footballers
Toulouse FC players
Nîmes Olympique players
AC Ajaccio players
Le Havre AC players
Sheffield United F.C. players
Scunthorpe United F.C. players
English Football League players
Süper Lig players
Ligue 1 players
Ligue 2 players
Senegalese expatriate footballers
Senegalese expatriate sportspeople in France
Expatriate footballers in France
Senegalese expatriate sportspeople in Turkey
Expatriate footballers in Turkey
Senegalese expatriate sportspeople in England
Expatriate footballers in England